Joghanab (also Romanized as Joghanāb, Jaghnāb, and Jeghanāb; also known as Chaginap and Cheqanāb) is a village in Sanjabad-e Gharbi Rural District, in the Central District of Kowsar County, Ardabil Province, Iran. At the 2006 census, its population was 471, in 90 families.

References 

Tageo

Towns and villages in Kowsar County